Petcharat Chotipala (born 20 December 1997), is a Thai professional footballer who plays as a right-back for Thai League 2 club Nakhon Si United.

References

External links
 

1998 births
Living people
Petcharat Chotipala
Petcharat Chotipala
Association football defenders
Petcharat Chotipala
Petcharat Chotipala
Petcharat Chotipala
Nakhon Si United F.C. players